Hunter County was one of the original Nineteen Counties in New South Wales and is now one of the 141 Cadastral divisions of New South Wales. It lies between the Hunter River in the north, and the Colo River in the south, including much of Wollemi National Park. Macdonald River lies to the east.

Hunter County was named in honour of Governor John Hunter (1737-1821).

Parishes within this county
A full list of parishes found within this county; their current LGA and mapping coordinates to the approximate centre of each location is as follows:

References

Counties of New South Wales